Ian Raynor (born 11 January 1972) is a Bermudian swimmer. He competed in four events at the 1992 Summer Olympics.

References

External links
 

1972 births
Living people
Bermudian male swimmers
Olympic swimmers of Bermuda
Swimmers at the 1992 Summer Olympics
Place of birth missing (living people)